Sig is a given name. Notable people with the given name include:

Sig Andrusking (1913–1994), American football player
Sig Arno (1895–1975), German-Jewish film actor
Sig Broskie (1911–1975), American baseball player
Sig Gissler, American professor
Sig Grava (1934–2009), American scholar
Sig Gryska (1914–1994), American baseball player
Sig Hansen (born 1966), American captain of the fishing vessel Northwestern on the TV series Deadliest Catch
Sig Haugdahl (1891–1970), Norwegian racing driver
Sig Herzig (1897–1985), American screenwriter
Sig Jakucki (1909–1979), American baseball player
Sig Libowitz, American lawyer
Sig Mejdal (born 1965), American baseball statisticians
Sig Rogich, Icelandic-American businessman
Sig Ruman (1884–1967), German-American actor
Sig Shore (1919–2006), American film director

Fictional characters
Sig, a character from the Jak & Daxter video game series
Sig, a character from the Puyo Puyo video game series

See also
Sig (disambiguation)
Sigmund (given name)
Sigismund
Siegfried

Masculine given names
Hypocorisms